Bruno Miguel Areias de Sousa (born 19 November 1980 in Póvoa de Varzim), known as Tito, is a Portuguese former professional footballer who played as a defensive midfielder.

References

External links

1980 births
Living people
People from Póvoa de Varzim
Portuguese footballers
Association football midfielders
Liga Portugal 2 players
Campeonato de Portugal (league) players
F.C. Famalicão players
Varzim S.C. players
C.D. Aves players
F.C. Tirsense players
Sportspeople from Porto District